The 2001 Paris–Tours was the 95th edition of the Paris–Tours cycle race and was held on 7 October 2001. The race started in Saint-Arnoult-en-Yvelines and finished in Tours. The race was won by Richard Virenque of the Domo–Farm Frites team.

General classification

References

2001 in French sport
2001
Paris-Tours
2001 in road cycling
October 2001 sports events in France